The Macara Baronetcy, of Ardmore in St Anne-on-the-Sea in the County of Lancaster, was a title in the Baronetage of the United Kingdom. It was created in 1911 for the Lancashire cotton-spinner, Charles Macara. The title became extinct upon the death of the fourth Baronet in Dudley in 1986.

Macara baronets, of Ardmore (1911)

Sir Charles Wright Macara, 1st Baronet (1845–1929), cotton spinner. He was founder of the Lifeboat Saturday movement for the Royal National Lifeboat Institution, the first recorded charity street collection. His wife, Lady Marion Macara, founded the Ladies Lifeboat Guild. 
Sir William Cowper Macara, 2nd Baronet (1875–1931)
Sir (Charles) Douglas Macara, 3rd Baronet (1904–1982)
Sir Hugh Kenneth Macara, 4th Baronet (1913–1986). After his succession in 1982, his name never appeared on the Official Roll of the Baronetage. He died without heir.

Notes

External links
1886: Southport and St Anne's lifeboats disaster, RNLI

Extinct baronetcies in the Baronetage of the United Kingdom